Anarchy is a 1989 Soviet drama film directed by Igor Gostev.

The film is based on the materials of the eponymous essay of Leonid Nikitinskij, published in the journal Ogoniok.

Plot 
The film tells about the "cruel games" of prisoners and the important role of the administration, which controls them using a denunciation system.

Cast 
 Andrey Tashkov as Yuriy «Kalgan» Kolganov
 Anton Androsov as Viktor «Philatelist» Moshkin
 Aleksandr Mokhov
 Lev Durov
 Sergey Garmash as «Mogol»
 Nail Idrisov as «Piston»
 Aleksey Ablepikhin
 Aleksandr Kuznetsov as First Lieutenant Kasimov
 Irina Averina as Lena
 Mikhail Chigaryov as Major with megaphone

References

External links 
 

1989 films
1980s Russian-language films
Soviet drama films
1989 crime drama films